Scopula longicerata is a moth of the family Geometridae. It was described by Hiroshi Inoue in 1955. It is endemic to Japan.

References

Moths described in 1955
longicerata
Endemic fauna of Japan
Moths of Japan
Taxa named by Hiroshi Inoue